Dilum Weerarathne (born 10 July 1996) is a Sri Lankan cricketer. He made his first-class debut for Sri Lanka Air Force Sports Club in Tier B of the 2017–18 Premier League Tournament on 28 December 2017.

References

External links
 

1996 births
Living people
Sri Lankan cricketers
Sri Lanka Air Force Sports Club cricketers
People from Matara, Sri Lanka